Gerhard Sandbichler (born 14 August 1957) is an Austrian luger who competed from the late 1970s to the late 1980s. He is best known for his third place overall Luge World Cup finish in men's singles in 1984-5.

Competing in three Winter Olympics, Sandbichler earned his best finish of fifth in the men's singles event at Lake Placid in 1980.

References

External links
1980 luge men's singles results
1984 luge men's singles results
1988 luge men's singles results
List of men's singles luge World Cup champions since 1978.

1957 births
Living people
Austrian male lugers
Lugers at the 1980 Winter Olympics
Lugers at the 1984 Winter Olympics
Lugers at the 1988 Winter Olympics
Olympic lugers of Austria